New Takoradi  is a town in the Western region of Ghana. It is 3 kilometres from the centre  Takoradi the Western regional capital. The serves both as a dormitory town as well as an industrialized zone.

Boundaries
The town is bordered on all sides by Takoradi, except for the south, where it shares a boundary with the Atlantic Ocean.

Notable places
Ghana Cement Company
Ghana Manganese Company
Ghana Bauxite Company

References

Populated places in the Western Region (Ghana)
Sekondi-Takoradi